Fischeln is the most southerly district of Krefeld, Germany. Older than Krefeld, Fischeln was first mentioned as "Viscolo" around 900AD. Fischeln became a district of Krefeld in 1929. 

Objects of interest in Fischeln include the church tower of the Saint Clemens church which was erected in 1170AD.

References
 

Krefeld